Elections held in the state of Washington on November 6, 2012.  A nonpartisan blanket primary was held on August 7, 2012.

Federal

U.S. President

In this election, Washington had 12 electors to the Electoral College. Incumbent Democratic president Barack Obama safely carried the state, gaining all 12 electoral votes against Republican nominee Mitt Romney.

U.S. Senate

Incumbent Democratic senator Maria Cantwell won re-election to a third term against Republican state senator Michael Baumgartner.

U.S. House

Due to the results of the 2010 United States Census, Washington elected U.S. Representatives from ten congressional districts, a gain of one seat.

Incumbents Rick Larsen (D-), Jaime Herrera Beutler (R-), Doc Hastings (R-), Cathy McMorris Rodgers (R-), Jim McDermott (D-), Dave Reichert (R-), and Adam Smith (R-) ran for re-election and won. Incumbents Jay Inslee (D-) and Norman D. Dicks (D-) retired and were respectively succeeded by Suzan DelBene (D) and Derek Kilmer (D). Denny Heck (D) was elected to the newly created .

The resulting composition was six Democrats and four Republicans.

State

Governor

Incumbent Democratic governor Christine Gregoire declined to run for a third term. Democratic congressman Jay Inslee ran to succeed her, earning Gregoire's endorsement. He faced Republican Attorney General Rob McKenna in the general election, defeating him by a small margin.

Lieutenant Governor
Incumbent Democratic lieutenant governor Brad Owen ran for re-election to a fifth term.

Polling

General election

Secretary of State

Incumbent Republican Secretary of State Sam Reed declined to run for re-election to a fourth term. The general election was won by Republican Thurston County auditor Kim Wyman, who defeated Democratic state senator Kathleen Drew by under one percentage point, resulting in the smallest statewide margin in 2012.

Attorney General

Incumbent Republican Attorney General Rob McKenna retired to run for governor and did not seek a third term. Two King County Councilmembers, Republican Reagan Dunn and Democrat Bob Ferguson, faced off in the general election. Ferguson ultimately won the election.

State Treasurer
Incumbent Democratic Treasurer James McIntire ran for re-election to a second term.

State Auditor
Incumbent Democratic Auditor Brian Sonntag declined to run for re-election to a sixth term. Democratic state representative Troy Kelley won the election, defeating Republican James Watkins.

Polling

General election

Insurance Commissioner
Incumbent Democratic Insurance Commissioner Mike Kreidler ran for re-election to a fourth term.

Commissioner of Public Lands
Incumbent Democratic Commissioner of Public Lands Peter J. Goldmark ran for re-election to a second term.

Superintendent of Public Instruction
Incumbent Democratic Superintendent of Public Instruction Randy Dorn ran for re-election to a second term. He was unopposed in the general election. The Superintendent is the only nonpartisan statewide election.

State Senate

The Democrats won on election night, but in early December two Democrats formed a conservative coalition with the Republican Caucus.

State House of Representatives

Judicial positions

Ballot measures
 Initiative 502 – Passed – Licensing and Regulating Marijuana

 Initiative 1185 – Passed – Supermajority to Raise Taxes or Close Loopholes

 Initiative 1240 – Passed – Allow Charter Schools

 Referendum 74 – Passed – Same Sex Marriage

References

 
Washington